The 2000–01 Danish Superliga season was the 11th season of the Danish Superliga league championship, governed by the Danish Football Association. It took place from the first match on July 22, 2000 to final match on June 13, 2001.

The Danish champions qualified for the second UEFA Champions League 2001-02 qualification round, while the second to third placed teams qualified for the first qualification round of the UEFA Cup 2001-02. The fourth and fifth placed teams qualified for the UEFA Intertoto Cup 2001, while the two lowest placed teams of the tournament was directly relegated to the Danish 1st Division. Likewise, the Danish 1st Division champions and runners-up were promoted to the Superliga.

Table

Results

Top goal scorers

See also
 2000-01 in Danish football

External links
  Fixtures at NetSuperligaen.dk
  Onside.dk by Viasat
  Peders Fodboldstatistik

Danish Superliga seasons
1
Denmark